Ahista Ahista (translation: Slowly Slowly) is a Hindi language film released in October, 1981. The film stars Shammi Kapoor, Nanda, Kunal Kapoor, Padmini Kolhapure, Shashikala, Ashalata Wabgaonkar and Rehman. This film is a remake of the Kannada film Gejje Pooje.

Plot
Courtesan Madame Subbalaxmi heads a household where men are not born, but are welcome. Women are not welcome, but their birth is. Subbalaxmi is thrilled when her protégé, Sangeeta, gives birth to a baby girl, who they name Chandra. Shortly thereafter they relocate to a small community. Sangeeta wants Chandra to study, and she is allowed to do so. Chandra meets her neighbor, Kunal, and their family, and is welcomed by them. Problems arise when Kunal and Chandra fall in love, as neither Kunal's family, nor Chandra's courtesan family will permit this marriage.

Cast 
 Shammi Kapoor as Sagar
 Nanda as Sangeeta
 Kunal Kapoor as Kunal
 Padmini Kolhapure as Chandra
 Rehman as Dr. Siddiqui
 Shashikala as Subbalaxmi
 Deven Verma as Savitri's Husband
 Aruna Irani as Savitri
 Kader Khan as Patron
 Ashalata Wabgaonkar as Kaveri
 Girish Karnad as Chandrakant
 Suresh Chatwal as Patron
 Soni Razdan as Deepa

Soundtrack
The music was composed By Khayyam. The music was a chartbuster in 1981 after release.

Awards and nominations

|-
| rowspan="2"|29th Filmfare Awards
| Nanda
| Filmfare Award for Best Supporting Actress
| 
|-
| Padmini Kolhapure
| Filmfare Special Performance Award
| 
|}

References

External links 
 

1980s Hindi-language films
1981 films
Films scored by Khayyam
Hindi remakes of Kannada films